Janith Silva (born 16 November 1990) is a Sri Lankan cricketer. He made his first-class debut for Sri Lanka Army Sports Club in the 2010–11 Premier Trophy on 22 April 2011. In August 2018, he was named in Kandy's squad the 2018 SLC T20 League.

References

External links
 

1990 births
Living people
Sri Lankan cricketers
Sri Lanka Army Sports Club cricketers